"Sleep Walk" is an instrumental song written, recorded, and released in 1959 by American instrumental rock and roll duo Santo & Johnny Farina, with their uncle Mike Dee playing the drums.
Prominently featuring steel guitar, the song was recorded at Trinity Music in Manhattan, New York City. "Sleep Walk" entered Billboard's Top 40 on August 17, 1959. It rose to the number 1 position for the last two weeks in September
and remained in the Top 40 until November 9. "Sleep Walk" also reached number 4 on the R&B chart. It was the last instrumental to hit number 1 in the 1950s and earned a gold record for Santo and Johnny. In Canada, the song reached number 3 in the CHUM Charts. In the UK it peaked at number 22 on the charts.

Background and recording 
As children, both Santo and Johnny Farina were encouraged by their father, Tony, to learn the steel guitar and write their own music. This music would be recorded on a Webcor tape recorder their father had bought for them. Unable to fall asleep one night after a gig, the Farina brothers decided to write some music, using the tape recorder to first record the harmonies to what would become "Sleep Walk". After adding and finalizing the steel guitar melody, Johnny Farina believed they had a hit song, so he spent a year and a half talking with various music publishers about the possibility of professionally recording "Sleep Walk".

The "Sleep Walk" demo made a positive impression on Ed Burton of Trinity Music. After ultimately signing with Canadian-American Records, the brothers recorded "Sleep Walk" at Trinity Music, using a triple-neck Fender Stringmaster on the recording.

Release 
"Sleep Walk" entered the Billboard Hot 100 on July 27, 1959. Announced on the radio by DJ Alan Freed, the instrumental rose in popularity until it became the number 1 single for the last two weeks of September of that year. After losing the position to Bobby Darin's recording of "Mack the Knife", it remained on Billboard's Top 40 until November 1959.

Chart performance

All-time charts

Later versions 
British group The Shadows recorded the tune for their 1961 album The Shadows.

"Sleep Walk" was a principal inspiration to Fleetwood Mac founder Peter Green for his 1968 instrumental "Albatross", which became a worldwide hit. "Albatross" in turn inspired the Beatles song "Sun King" from Abbey Road.

The song "Sleepwalking (Couples Only Dance Prom Night)" by the band Modest Mouse, from their 1996 EP Interstate 8, drew inspiration from "Sleep Walk" in its melody, with the main addition to the original being added vocals/lyrics.

The Brian Setzer Orchestra rendering of "Sleep Walk" received a Grammy Award for Best Pop Instrumental Performance of 1998.

Joe Satriani covered the song on his 2002 album "Strange, Beautiful Music".

Sleepwalkers 
The song inspired Stephen King to write his first screenplay, for the 1992 horror film Sleepwalkers. The film features the song as well.

See also 
List of Billboard Hot 100 number-one singles of 1959
50s progression

References 

1959 songs
1959 singles
Santo & Johnny songs
Billboard Hot 100 number-one singles
Canadian-American Records singles
Rock instrumentals
1950s instrumentals